Group 5 of the 2017 UEFA European Under-21 Championship qualifying competition consisted of six teams: Denmark, Romania, Armenia, Wales, Bulgaria, and Luxembourg. The composition of the nine groups in the qualifying group stage was decided by the draw held on 5 February 2015.

The group was played in home-and-away round-robin format. The group winners qualified directly for the final tournament, while the runners-up advanced to the play-offs if they were one of the four best runners-up among all nine groups (not counting results against the sixth-placed team).

Standings

Matches
Times are CEST (UTC+2) for dates between 29 March and 24 October 2015 and between 27 March and 29 October 2016, for other dates times are CET (UTC+1).

Goalscorers
8 goals

 Marcus Ingvartsen

3 goals

 Gor Malakyan
 Pione Sisto
 Adrian Păun
 George Pușcaș
 Wes Burns
 Tommy O'Sullivan

2 goals

 Artem Simonyan
 Nikola Kolev
 Georgi Minchev
 Frederik Børsting
 Andrew Hjulsager
 Casper Nielsen
 Alexandru Ioniță
 Jake Charles
 Ellis Harrison
 Harry Wilson

1 goal

 Aram Shakhnazaryan
 Kiril Despodov
 Aleksandar Georgiev
 Kristiyan Malinov
 Yuliyan Nenov
 Toni Tasev
 Borislav Tsonev
 Antonio Vutov
 Lucas Andersen
 Patrick Banggaard
 Kasper Dolberg
 Viktor Fischer
 Emiliano Hansen
 Kenneth Zohore
 Glenn Borges
 Kevin Kerger
 Ricardo Pinto
 Danel Sinani
 Milos Todorovic
 Claudiu Bumba
 Robert Hodorogea
 George Miron
 Ionuț Nedelcearu
 Ovidiu Popescu
 Florin Tănase
 Bogdan Țîru
 Josh Yorwerth

1 own goal

 Aram Shakhnazaryan (against Wales)
 Enes Mahmutović (against Denmark)

References

External links
Standings and fixtures at UEFA.com

Group 5